Victoria Azarenka and Ágnes Szávay were the defending champions, but did not compete in the Juniors that year.

Sharon Fichman and Anastasia Pavlyuchenkova won the title, defeating Agnieszka Radwańska and Caroline Wozniacki in the final, 6–7(4–7), 6–2, 6–1.

Seeds

  Agnieszka Radwańska /  Caroline Wozniacki (final)
  Yung-Jan Chan /  Ayumi Morita (quarterfinals)
  Sharon Fichman /  Anastasia Pavlyuchenkova (champions)
  Julia Cohen /  Sacha Jones (second round)
  Mihaela Buzărnescu /  Alexandra Dulgheru (semifinals)
  Teliana Pereira /  Kateřina Vaňková (first round)
  Raluca Olaru /  Amina Rakhim (quarterfinals)
  Sorana Cîrstea /  Alexandra Panova (semifinals)

Draw

Finals

Top half

Bottom half

Sources
Draw

Girls' Doubles
French Open, 2006 Girls' Doubles